Gez Boland (also Romanized as Gaz Boland) is a village in Howmeh Rural District, in the Central District of Dashtestan County, Bushehr Province, Iran. At the 2006 census, its population was 321, in 76 families.

References 

Populated places in Dashtestan County